The 24th Producers Guild of America Awards (also known as 2013 Producers Guild Awards), honoring the best film and television producers of 2012, were held at The Beverly Hilton Hotel in Beverly Hills, California on January 26, 2013. The television nominations were announced on November 28, 2012, the documentary nominations on November 30, 2012, and the motion picture nominations on January 2, 2013.

Winners and nominees

Film
{| class=wikitable style="width="100%"
|-
! colspan="2" style="background:#abcdef;"| Darryl F. Zanuck Award for Outstanding Producer of Theatrical Motion Pictures
|-
| colspan="2" style="vertical-align:top;"|
 Argo – Ben Affleck, George Clooney, and Grant Heslov Beasts of the Southern Wild – Michael Gottwald, Dan Janvey, and Josh Penn
 Django Unchained – Reginald Hudlin, Pilar Savone, and Stacey Sher
 Les Misérables – Tim Bevan, Eric Fellner, Debra Hayward, and Cameron Mackintosh
 Life of Pi – Ang Lee, Gil Netter, and David Womark
 Lincoln – Kathleen Kennedy and Steven Spielberg
 Moonrise Kingdom – Wes Anderson, Jeremy Dawson, Steven Rales, and Scott Rudin
 Silver Linings Playbook – Bruce Cohen, Donna Gigliotti, and Jonathan Gordon
 Skyfall – Barbara Broccoli and Michael G. Wilson
 Zero Dark Thirty – Kathryn Bigelow, Mark Boal, and Megan Ellison
|-
! colspan="2" style="background:#abcdef;"| Outstanding Producer of Animated Theatrical Motion Pictures
|-
| colspan="2" style="vertical-align:top;"|
 Wreck-It Ralph – Clark Spencer Brave – Katherine Sarafian
 Frankenweenie – Tim Burton and Allison Abbate
 ParaNorman – Travis Knight and Arianne Sutner
 Rise of the Guardians – Christina Steinberg and Nancy Bernstein
|-
! colspan="2" style="background:#abcdef;"| Outstanding Producer of Documentary Theatrical Motion Pictures
|-
| colspan="2" style="vertical-align:top;"|
 Searching for Sugar Man – Malik Bendjelloul and Simon Chinn A People Uncounted – Marc Swenker and Aaron Yegerr
 The Gatekeepers – Estelle Fialon, Philippa Kowarsky, and Dror Moreh
 The Island President – Richard Berge and Bonni Cohen
 The Other Dream Team – Marius Markevicius and Jon Weinbach
|}

Television

Digital

David O. Selznick Achievement Award in Theatrical Motion PicturesTim Bevan and Eric FellnerMilestone AwardBob and Harvey WeinsteinNorman Lear Achievement Award in TelevisionJ. J. AbramsStanley Kramer AwardBully

Visionary Award
Russell Simmons

References

External links
 

 2012
2012 film awards
2012 television awards
2013 in California